Portland Christian Junior/Senior High School is a 6-12 private Christian school in Portland, Oregon, United States. The school has been accredited by the Association of Christian Schools International since 1981, and by the Northwest Association of Accredited Schools since 1991.

History
Portland Christian Schools was established in the fall of 1947 by local parents who wanted a Christian school present in the Portland area. These parents had a vision for a school where students could receive an education that was also rooted in Christian values. This would soon become the "Christian School Society of Portland, Oregon."

With just four teachers and eighty students in grades K-8 the school opened. In 1949 the school added high school classes and in 1951 Portland Christian School graduated its first class of ten students.

Activities
The athletic programs compete in the 2A Division. Students are able to participate in cross country, volleyball, football, soccer, basketball, baseball, softball and track. Additional co-curricular activities include: National Honor Society, ski club, art club, drama club, worship team, jazz band, concert band, choir, ensemble, student government, an international club called Friends Across Borders (FAB) and a number of different community outreaches that students are able to participate in.

Notable alumni
 Kim Hill, 2008, Olympic volleyball player
 Todd Hoffman, 1987, Gold Rush reality TV show participant
 Elijah Monnes, 2007 [unfinished unfinished business] Best basketball player in school history, just ask Jesse Severson [JLBD]. Elijah is a professional saliva collector at Dental office.

References

High schools in Portland, Oregon
Educational institutions established in 1947
Private middle schools in Oregon
Christian schools in Oregon
Private high schools in Oregon
1947 establishments in Oregon